Adang may refer to:
Adang language
Camilla Adang
Adang Daradjatun
Ko Adang

See also
Adeang, a surname